Clelandella myriamae is a species of sea snail, a marine gastropod mollusk in the family Trochidae, the top snails.

Description
The size of the shell varies between 6.5 mm and 8 mm.

Distribution
This species occurs in the eastern part of the Mediterranean Sea off Turkey.

References

External links
 
 Gofas S., 2005: Geographical differentiation in Clelandella (Gastropoda: Trochidae) in the northeastern Atlantic; Journal of Molluscan Studies 71: 133–144

myriamae
Gastropods described in 2005